Lancelot is a text adventure game by Level 9 released in 1988. It features static graphics on some platforms. The plot focuses on Lancelot's quest to find the Holy Grail.

Plot
Designed by Peter Austin with in-game text by Christina Erskine and Peter McBride, Lancelot describes the adventures of Sir Lancelot as recounted in Sir Thomas Malory's Le Morte d'Arthur.  Like other interactive fiction releases from Level 9 such as Scapeghost, gameplay is divided into three parts.  Lancelot's overall objectives are to complete the Order of the Knights of the Round Table and ultimately to recover the Holy Grail. The lore drawn from Arthurian legend allows for a vast range of familiar settings (such as Camelot, Tintagel, and Winchester) and characters (like Merlin, Arthur, Guenever, and Lancelot's son Galahad).  As Lancelot grows in power and completes quests, several knights and ladies accompany him on his travels, and many of these non-player characters can be controlled by providing instructions through the game's parser.  These supporting characters include the Damosel Maledisant, Sir Bors de Ganis, Sir Ector de Maris, Sir Tristram, and several others.

Lancelot's first challenge is to face the Black Knight in combat.  If he is merciful with him, Lancelot learns that the knight is really the disguised King Arthur, who invites Lancelot to become part of his order of knights.  At his knighting the next day, Lancelot discovers his feelings for Guenever, and seeks to prove his worth to her.  Arthur tasks Lancelot with scouring the kingdom to recover several lost knights, including Sir Meliot, Sir Lamorak, Sir Bors, and Sir Gawain, many of whom are held captive by rebel lords.  To prove his honor, Lancelot must only engage in combat when provoked.  The final stage of the story sees Lancelot setting off from Castle Vagon with Sir Galahad in search of the Holy Grail.

Reception

Sinclair User: "... up to the usual high standard we have come to expect from Level 9..."
The Micro User: "Lancelot has just got to be Game of the Year for me."

References

External links
 
 Lancelot at Hall of Light (HOL): The Database of Amiga Games
 
 

1980s interactive fiction
1988 video games
Amiga games
Amstrad CPC games
Amstrad PCW games
Atari 8-bit family games
Atari ST games
BBC Micro and Acorn Electron games
Commodore 64 games
DOS games
Fantasy video games set in the Middle Ages
Level 9 Computing games
Video games based on Arthurian legend
Video games developed in the United Kingdom
ZX Spectrum games